Sir Dermott Ó Seachnasaigh, Chief of the Name, died 1673.

Ó Seachnasaigh was married to Joan, daughter of Lord Barrymore and had sons Roger and Cormac. A copy of his will survives.

References

 
 History of Galway, James Hardiman, 1820
 Tabular pedigrees of O'Shaughnessy of Gort (1543–1783), Martin J. Blake, Journal of the Galway Archaeological and Historical Society, vi (1909–10), p. 64; vii (1911–12), p. 53.
 John O'Donovan. The Genealogies, Tribes, and Customs of Hy-Fiachrach. Dublin: Irish Archaeological Society. 1844. Pedigree of O'Shaughnessy: pp. 372–91.
 Old Galway, Professor Mary Donovan O'Sullivan, 1942
 Galway: Town and Gown, edited Moran et al., 1984
 Galway: History and Society, 1996

People from County Galway
Dermott
17th-century Irish people
1673 deaths
Year of birth missing